Luigi Meneghello (16 February 1922 – 26 June 2007) was an Italian contemporary writer and scholar.

Biography
Luigi Meneghello was born in Malo, a small town in the countryside near Vicenza, on 16 February 1922. His father was a craftsman and his mother was a teacher.  Meneghello entered in 1939 the University of Padua to study philosophy. From 1940 to 1942 worked for Paduan newspaper Il Veneto. In the early Forties, he had his first contacts with anti-fascism and, after a short time in the Army, entered the Partito d'azione and became active in the resistance movement in 1943. Of his early life, he said:

In 1945 Meneghello graduated cum laude with a thesis on the philosophy of Benedetto Croce. In 1947 he moved to the University of Reading (England) with a one-year British Council scholarship and afterward he began teaching aspects of the Italian Renaissance in the English Department. In 1948 he married Katia Bleier, a survivor of Auschwitz. In 1955 a separate Italian section was formed followed by the founding of a Department of Italian Studies in 1961, headed by himself until his retirement in 1980. He was offered, and accepted, a chair as Professor in Italian Literature. After an intense academic activity and as translator (often with the pseudonym Ugo Varnai), in 1963 he published his first book, part novel part autobiography, Libera nos a Malo (English translation titled Deliver Us) about the narrow-minded but vital milieu of his home town, Malo. The title is a pun on the Latin words for deliver us from evil and the name of the town. One year later he published I piccoli maestri (literally, "The Little Teachers"). This book was translated into English in 1967, and published as The Outlaws. This book was considered "one of the few non-rhetorical, and therefore all the more effective, memoirs of the Italian resistance, which is true in every detail" (L. and G. Lepschy, in the "Guardian obituary"). A film version with the same title was directed in 1998 by Daniele Luchetti.

In 1980 Meneghello retired from the University of Reading, to devote his time to writing. He lived in London and later in Thiene (near Vicenza), where he moved permanently after his wife's death in 2004. He died there in June 2007.

Bibliography
Libera nos a Malo (1963, translated in English as Deliver Us by Frederika Randall, Northwestern University Press, 2011)
I piccoli maestri (1964, translated into English in 1967 as The Outlaws by Raleigh Trevelyan)
Pomo Pero (1974)
Fiori italiani (1976)
L’acqua di Malo (1986)
Il Tremaio. Note sull’interazione tra lingua e dialetto nelle scritture letterarie (1986)
Jura (1987)
Bau-Sète! (1988)
Leda e la schioppa (1989)
Rivarotta (1989)
Che fate quel giovane? (1990)
Maredè, Maredè (1991)
Il dispatrio (1993)
Promemoria (1994)
Il Turbo e il Chiaro (1996)
La materia di Reading (1997)
Le Carte. Volume I: Anni sessanta (1999)
Le Carte. Volume II: Anni settanta (2000)
Le Carte. Volume III: Anni ottanta (2001)
Trapianti. Dall'inglese al vicentino (2002)
Quaggiù nella biosfera. Tre saggi sul lievito poetico delle scritture (2004)
La materia di Reading e altri reperti (2005)

References

:it:Luigi Meneghello
Foreword from 
Obituary, The Guardian, 17 August 2007 (see External links)

External links
Obituary, The Times, 1 August 2007
Obituary, The Guardian, 17 August 2007 (originary, slightly different version at the University of Reading website)
Villa Clementi: istituzione culturale del Comune di Malo, webpage about Meneghello by Malo town council 
Luigi Meneghello - an introduction, article at Citizendium

1922 births
2007 deaths
People from the Province of Vicenza
Italian resistance movement members
Academics of the University of Reading
20th-century Italian novelists
20th-century Italian male writers
21st-century Italian novelists
21st-century Italian male writers